Professional institutions are the societies and associations, they help develop and promote a career and the people who practice in it. There are many chartered professional institutes in the UK, over 80, that cover many different areas of work. The different areas of work that are covered includes constructions, health, journalism, personnel, finance, engineering, law and of course, management. The professional institutes can help you both before and after you graduate.

Introduction
There are institutes that have websites that you're able to sign up to, where they help you with your development and challenges within the professional institutes. One of the websites that provides this service is Management & Leadership Development and Training the Chartered Management Institute. You are able to attend events and take courses based on many different types of institutes in management and learn about development, these would include: Leadership event, Building a business event, Visionary leaders event, Introduction to Management course and Essential management skills course. They say that they are the only Awarding Body that are able to award Chartered Manager status, which is the ultimate management accolade.

Different institutes have different ways of helping you further in your career, such as learning styles. The institutes would assess you, and how they assess you would be individual to the institute; it would most likely be based on your education, knowledge, skills and experience. They might also have different ways of grading and awarding points, as well as different types of membership that you're able to have; some institutes have one day programs, monthly programs and even group programs.

Management
Management is a major factor in all careers, it consists of organising, controlling, planning and also, directing. Management is at the top of hierarchy as it is what controls everything else within a company/business. If there is no management, then there would be no order or organisation within a company, this would result in the company not being successful. This is why institutes for management would be important and very useful.

There are many different areas of work that go into management; it expands into many different sectors due to how broad management is. Some of the different types of management includes, Accounting management, Business management and Marketing management.

Institutes
An institute is an organisation that has a particular purpose, in this case, the purpose is for further and higher education; some higher education institutions hold university statues'.

The higher education institutions need to have a distinct image that they should maintain and also to develop, this would be so that they can create a competitive advantage as the market is increasingly competitive. There is a tertiary education system that is undergoing fundamental metamorphosis, this is both in the UK and South Africa; they are both facing changes in government funding. There are at least 71 different institutes that are represented in the UK and at least 20 different institutions from South Africa.

There is also a company website called 'IMD World Competitiveness Centre', they have a partnership with institutes and have a worldwide network. They have partner institutes in 55 countries; the IMD World Competitiveness Centre helps with business, academics highlight competitive advantage, governments and undercover opportunities by offering a range of products and services which includes workshops and economy assessments. They have partner institutes in Africa/Middle East and they include in Israel, Jordan, Qatar, South Africa and United Arab Emirates. Partner Institutes in America includes, Argentina, Brazil, Canada, Chile, Colombia, Mexico, Peru and Venezuela. In Asia/Pacific they include Australia, China, Hong Kong, India, Indonesia, Japan, Korea, Malaysia, New Zealand, Philippines, Singapore, Taiwan and Thailand. Lastly, in Europe they include, Austria, Belgium, Bulgaria, Croatia, Czech Republic, Denmark, Estonia, Finland, France, Germany, Greece, Hungary, Iceland, Italy, Kazakhstan, Lithuania, Luxembourg, Netherlands, Norway, Poland, Portugal, Republic of Ireland, Romania, Russia, Slovak Republic, Slovenia, Spain, Turkey and Ukraine.

Although there are institutes that are profitable, there are also institutes that are not profitable. In the UK, there is an institute called 'Project Management Institute' and it is the world's leading non profitable professional membership association. It was founded in 1969 and it delivers value for more than 2.9 million professionals that work in nearly every country, they advance careers and improve organisational success.

UK
The UK government policies dictate that education in higher education institutes look to profit-making organisations for models that would help with performance improvement (Galloway, 1998). This would mean that there is a need for strengthening of the partnership between educational institutes and business.

Chartered Institute of Personnel and Development
Chartered Management Institute
Institute of Administrative Management
Institute of Interim Management
Institute of Leadership & Management
Institute of Management Consultancy

Outside of the UK
Some of them include:

Institute of Management of Sri Lanka
Indian Institutes of Management
Jaipuria Institute of Management
Australian Institute of Management
Goa Institute of Management
International Institute for Management Development
Singapore Institute of Management

See also
List of management topics
Higher Education

References

www.isinepal.com 
www.managerialskillstraining.com 
www.corporatetrainingbangkok.com

Management education
management